The Port Colden Historic District is a historic district in the Port Colden section of Washington Township, Warren County, New Jersey. It was an important transportation location, being on the Morris Canal and the Morris and Essex Railroad. The district was added to the National Register of Historic Places on January 21, 1999 for its significance in transportation, development pattern, commerce, education, and architecture from 1824 to 1924.

Gallery

See also
 National Register of Historic Places listings in Warren County, New Jersey
 Port Murray Historic District

References

Washington Township, Warren County, New Jersey
National Register of Historic Places in Warren County, New Jersey
Historic districts on the National Register of Historic Places in New Jersey
New Jersey Register of Historic Places
Greek Revival architecture in New Jersey
Gothic Revival architecture in New Jersey